Shinola was the third album from Northern Ireland-based rock band, Energy Orchard, and was released in 1993.  The name is a reference to Shinola shoe polish, and is a word play on the associated colloquialism.

Track listing
All tracks composed by Bap Kennedy; except where noted.
 "Coming Through" – 4:34
 "Madame George" (Van Morrison) – 6:01
 "Atlantic City" – 3:40
 "Stay Away" – 4:20
 "Don't Fail Me Now" – 4:19
 "In My Room" – 3:08
 "Seven Sisters" (Bap Kennedy, Kevin Breslin) – 4:24
 "The Star of the County Down" (Traditional; arranged by Energy Orchard) – 3:30
 "London Fields" (Bap Kennedy, Kevin Breslin) – 4:08
 "Big Town" (Bap Kennedy, Kevin Breslin) – 4:54
 "I'm No Angel" – 3:05
 "Sailor Town" – 4:03
 "Belfast" (Joby Fox) – 6:08
 "Somebody's Brother" – 5:46
 "Stop the Machine" – 3:57
 "Gloria" (Van Morrison) – 5:46

Tracks 12-16 recorded live at The Dome, Tufnell Park, London on St. Patrick's Day 1993

Personnel
Energy Orchard
Bap Kennedy - vocals, guitar, harmonica
Paul Toner - lead guitar, backing vocals
Spade McQuade - bass, mandolin, backing vocals
Kevin Breslin - keyboards
David Toner - drums
with:
Kate St. John - oboe on "Madame George"
Adrianna Christofi, Michele John, Xavier Barnett - backing vocals on "In My Room"

References

1993 albums
Energy Orchard albums